Jan Gossaert (c. 1478 – 1 October 1532) was a French-speaking painter from the Low Countries also known as Jan Mabuse (the name he adopted from his birthplace, Maubeuge) or Jennyn van Hennegouwe (Hainaut), as he called himself when he matriculated in the Guild of Saint Luke, at Antwerp, in 1503.  He was one of the first painters of Dutch and Flemish Renaissance painting to visit Italy and Rome, which he did in 1508–09, and a leader of the style known as Romanism, which brought elements of Italian Renaissance painting to the north, sometimes with a rather awkward effect.  He achieved fame across at least northern Europe, and painted religious subjects, including large altarpieces, but also portraits and mythological subjects, including some nudity.

From at least 1508 he was apparently continuously employed, or at least retained, by quasi-royal patrons, mostly members of the extended Habsburg family, heirs to the Valois Duchy of Burgundy.  These were Philip of Burgundy, Adolf of Burgundy, Christian II of Denmark when in exile, and Mencía de Mendoza, Countess of Nassau, third wife of Henry III of Nassau-Breda.

He was a contemporary of Albrecht Dürer and the rather younger Lucas van Leyden, whom he knew, but he has tended to be less highly regarded in modern times than they were. Unlike them, he was not a printmaker, though his surviving drawings are very fine, and are preferred by some to his paintings.

Biography

His name was in fact "Jan Gossart", and he was so known in his lifetime; the Dutch version "Gossaert" crept into later sources, despite Gossart's first language being French. Little is known of his early life. One of his earliest biographers, Karel van Mander, claimed he was from a small town in Artois or Henegouwen (County of Hainaut) called Maubeuge or Maubuse. Other scholars have determined he was the son of a bookbinder who received his training at Maubeuge Abbey, while the RKD mentions there is evidence to support a claim that he was born in Duurstede Castle. He is registered in the Antwerp Guild of Saint Luke in 1503.

In 1508-9 he travelled to Rome, either in the company of, or later sent by, Philip of Burgundy, an illegitimate son of Duke Philip the Good, who was sent as ambassador to Pope Julius II by Philip the Handsome. Philip's party, very likely including Gossaert, left the Netherlands in October 1508, arrived in Rome on 14 January 1509, and was back at The Hague by 28 June 1509. Although the details are unclear, it seems that Gossaert remained in Philip's employment until he died in 1524, by then Bishop of Utrecht.  However, throughout this time he was able to work for other patrons, mostly friends of Philip.

In 1509–17 Gossaert was registered as a resident of Middelburg. According to Van Mander he was one of the first Flemish artists to bring back the Italian manner of painting with much nudity in historical allegories. From 1517 to 1524 he is registered at Duurstede Castle where according to the RKD, he had Jan van Scorel as pupil. From 1524 onwards he returned to Middelburg as court painter to Adolf of Burgundy, another Habsburg relative.  Jan Mertens the Younger was another pupil.

He was a contemporary of Lucas van Leyden, and was influenced by artists who came before him, such as Rogier van der Weyden, the great master of Tournai and Brussels and, like him, his compositions were usually framed in architectural backgrounds.

Works

Gossaert shows Antwerp influence in the large altar-pieces previously located at Castle Howard and Scawby. The bright and decided contrasts of pigment in colored reliefs are like Hans Memling, and the cornered and packed drapery are like Van der Weyden, while the bold but Socratic cast of face are like the works of Quentin Matsys. At Scawby he illustrates the legend of the count of Toulouse, who parted with his worldly goods to assume the frock of a hermit. His altarpiece of the Descent from the Cross with heavy double doors in Middelburg was admired by Albrecht Dürer before the church itself was hit by lightning. This is possibly the work now in the Hermitage, though Van Mander stated the lightning destroyed it and describes another Descent of the Cross in the possession of Mr. Magnus of Delft in 1604.

At Castle Howard, the Earl of Carlisle had obtained The Adoration of the Kings previously created for the Grandmontines, which throws together some thirty figures on an architectural background, varied in detail, massive in shape and fanciful in ornament. This painting is now on display at the National Gallery, which bought it in 1911.  Gossaert surprises the viewer with pompous costume and flaring contrasts of tone. His figures, like pieces on a chess-board, are often rigid and conventional. The landscape which shows through the colonnades is adorned with towers and steeples in the minute fashion of Van der Weyden. After a residence of a few years at Antwerp, Gossaert took service with Philip of Burgundy, bastard of Philip the Good, at that time lord of Somerdyk and admiral of Zeeland. One of his pictures had already become celebrated: a Descent from the Cross (50 figures), on the high altar of Tongerlo Abbey.

Philip of Burgundy ordered Gossaert to execute a replica for the church of Middelburg, and the value which was then set on the picture is apparent from the fact that Dürer came expressly to Middelburg (1521) to see it. In 1568 the altarpiece perished by fire. In 1508 Gossaert accompanied Philip of Burgundy on his Italian mission to the pope, and by this accident an important revolution was effected in the art of the Netherlands. Gossaert appears to have chiefly studied in Italy the cold and polished works of the Leonardesques. He not only brought home a new style, but he also introduced the fashion of travelling to Italy; and from that time till the age of Rubens and Van Dyck it was considered proper that all Flemish painters should visit the peninsula. The Flemings grafted Italian mannerisms on their own stock, and the cross turned out so unfortunately that for a century Flemish art lost all trace of originality.

Gossaert undoubtedly made a large number of drawings in Rome after the innumerable ancient ruins and sculptures that the city had. Today only four surviving magazines are known; a sheet with the ruins of the Colosseum (Berlin, Kupferstichkabinett), a study of the so-called Apollo Kitharoedos (Venice, Accademia), a study of the so-called Capitolean Hercules (Private collection, London), and a sheet with studies of, among others, the famous Spinario or “thorn extractor” (Leiden, Leiden University Library's Print Room).

In the summer of 1509 Philip returned to the Netherlands, and, retiring to his seat of Suytburg in Zeeland, surrendered himself to the pleasures of planning decorations for his castle and ordering pictures of Gossaert and Jacopo de' Barbari. Being in constant communication with the court of Margaret of Austria at Mechelen, he gave the artists in his employ fair chances of promotion. Barbari was made court painter to the regent, whilst Gossaert received less important commissions. Records prove that Gossaert painted a (posthumous) portrait of Eleanor of Portugal, and other small pieces, for Charles V in 1516.

But his only signed pictures of this period are the Neptune and Amphitrite of 1516 at Berlin, and the Madonna, with a portrait of Jean Carondelet of 1517, at the Louvre, both of which suggest that Vasari only spoke by hearsay of the progress made by Gossaert in the true method of producing pictures full of mythological nude figures and poesies. It is difficult to find anything more coarse or misshapen than the Amphitrite, unless it is the grotesque and ungainly drayman who figures for Neptune. In later forms of the same subject—the Adam and Eve at Hampton Court, or its feebler replica at Berlin and Venus and Amor (Royal Museums of Fine Arts of Belgium, Brussels)—there is more nudity, combined with realism of the commonest type.

Happily, Gossaert was capable of higher efforts. His St Luke painting the portrait of the Virgin in Sanct Veit at Prague, a variety of the same subject in the Belvedere at Vienna, the Madonna of the Baring collection in London, or the numerous repetitions of Christ and the scoffers (Ghent and Antwerp), all prove that travel had left many of Gossaert's fundamental peculiarities unaltered. His figures still retain the character of stone; his architecture is as rich and varied, his tones are as strong as ever. But bright contrasts of gaudy tints are replaced by soberer greys; and a cold haze, the sfumato of the Milanese, pervades the surfaces. It is but seldom that these features fail to obtrude. When they least show, the master displays a brilliant palette combined with smooth surface and incisive outlines. In this form the Madonnas of Munich and Vienna (1527), the likeness of a girl weighing gold pieces (Berlin), and the portraits of the children of the king of Denmark at Hampton Court, are fair specimens of his skill.

As early as 1523, when Christian II of Denmark came to the Netherlands, he asked Gossaert to paint the likenesses of his dwarfs. In 1528 he requested the artist to furnish to Jean de Hare the design for his queen Isabellas tomb in the abbey of St Pierre near Ghent. It was no doubt at this time that Gossaert completed the portraits of John, Dorothy and Christine, children of Christian II, which came into the collection of Henry VIII. No doubt, also, these portraits are identical with those of three children at Hampton Court, which were long known and often copied as likenesses of Prince Arthur, Prince Henry and Princess Margaret of England. One of the copies at Wilton, inscribed with the forged name of Hans Holbein, ye father, and the false date of 1495, has often been cited as a proof that Gossaert came to England in the reign of Henry VII; but the statement rests on no foundation whatever.

At the period when these portraits were executed Gossaert lived at Middelburg. But he dwelt at intervals elsewhere. When Philip of Burgundy became bishop of Utrecht, and settled at Duurstede Castle, in 1517, he was accompanied by Gossaert, who helped to decorate the new palace of his master. At Philip's death, in 1524, Gossaert designed and erected his tomb in the church of Wijk bij Duurstede. He finally retired to Middelburg, where he took service with Philip's brother, Adolph, lord of Veeren.

Carel van Mander's biography accuses Gossaert of an unruly life; yet it describes the solid education he must have had to learn his trade so well. It also describes the splendid appearance of Gossaert, dressed in gold brocade, as he accompanied Lucas van Leyden on a pleasure trip to Ghent, Mechelen and Antwerp in 1527.
The works of Gossaert are those of a hardworking and patient artist; the number of his still extant pictures practically demonstrates that he was not a debauchee. The marriage of his daughter with the painter Henry van der Heyden of Leuven proves that he had a home, and did not live habitually in taverns. His death at Antwerp is recorded in the portrait engraved by Jerome Cock.

Notes

References
 Campbell, Lorne, "Biography – Jan Gossaert (Jean Gossart)" , National Gallery, London

Further reading
Ainsworth, Maryan Wynn, Man, Myth, and Sensual Pleasures: Jan Gossart's Renaissance : the Complete Works, 2010, Metropolitan Museum of Art,  9781588393982, fully online
 Snyder, James. Northern Renaissance Art, 1985, Harry N. Abrams, 
 Nadine M. Orenstein, 'Jan Gossaert's Mocking of Christ: A Reversal of States', Print Quarterly, XXVIII, 2011, 249–55
 Bass, M. A. (2016). Jan Gossart and the invention of Netherlandish antiquity. Princeton University Press.

External links
 
 7 full catalogue entries from the National Gallery, London, by Lorne Campbell
 Works and literature at PubHist

1470s births
1532 deaths
Year of birth uncertain
People from Maubeuge
16th-century Flemish painters
Flemish Renaissance painters
Painters from Antwerp
Court painters